The 2019–20 Georgia State Panthers women's basketball team represented Georgia State University in the 2019–20 NCAA Division I women's basketball season. The Panthers, led by second year head coach Gene Hill, were a member of the Sun Belt Conference and played their home games on campus at the GSU Sports Arena. They finished season 8–21, 5–13 in Sun Belt play to finish in eleventh place. They were not invited to the Sun Belt tournament following the conclusion of the regular season, and, soon after, the NCAA canceled all post-season play due to the COVID-19 pandemic.

Preseason

Sun Belt coaches poll
On October 30, 2019, the Sun Belt released their preseason coaches poll with the Panthers predicted to finish in sixth place in the conference.

Sun Belt Preseason All-Conference team

1st team

Jada Lewis – R-JR, Guard

Roster

Schedule

|-
!colspan=9 style=| Non–conference regular season

|-
!colspan=9 style=| Sun Belt regular season

See also
 2019–20 Georgia State Panthers men's basketball team

References

Georgia State
Georgia State Panthers women's basketball seasons